The Robert Louis Stevenson Memorial is an outdoor memorial commemorating Robert Louis Stevenson, in Portsmouth Square, San Francisco, California.

References

External links

 

Chinatown, San Francisco
Monuments and memorials in California
Outdoor sculptures in San Francisco
Robert Louis Stevenson